Prestbury is a village and civil parish in the borough of Cheltenham in Gloucestershire, England. Located on the outskirts of Cheltenham and part of the Tewkesbury parliamentary constituency.

The parish of Prestbury had a population of 6,981 according to the 2011 census.

History 
The name of the village means "Priests fortified place", from Anglo-Saxon preost and burh, possibly from a fortified manor house belonging to the Bishop of Hereford in the 13th century. The settlement is mentioned as Preosdabyrig in 899-904. Prestbury is listed in the 1086 Doomsday Book as "Presteberie", part of the property of the church of Hereford, with 18 villagers, five smallholders, a priest, a riding man and 11 slaves. By the 13th century it had become Presbery. In 1249 the Bishop of Hereford was granted permission to hold a weekly market along with a three-day annual fair in August.

The village became eclipsed by Cheltenham following the end of the medieval period. The market started to decline in the 15th century and had lapsed completely by the start of the 18th century. In the middle of the 18th century a mineral spring was discovered in the parish, and by 1751 a local landowner, Lord Craven, had a business providing bathing and lodging. However it did not last past the end of the century.

The Prestbury War Memorial is a Cotswold stone gothic revival column with six engraved panels commemorating the villagers who died in the First World War (1914–1918). The memorial was severely damaged in October 2011 in an act of vandalism when the column was toppled to the ground and smashed.

There are claims that Prestbury is the most haunted village in England, and one of the most haunted in Britain.

Amenities 
The village shops include two stores and petrol station with store. There is a public library, three hairdressers, a pharmacy, and a butcher. A brasserie and pub, the King's Arms, was the village's main public house, and it was here that the 19th-century jockey Fred Archer grew up, his father being the landlord of the pub. There are three further village pubs: the Plough, the Beehive and the Royal Oak.

Prestbury Racecourse 
The village is home to Prestbury Park, the Cheltenham Racecourse, which holds the Gold Cup race each March. Racehorse trainers Frenchy Nicholson and his son David Nicholson had stables in Prestbury. Notable Nicholson apprentices include Pat Eddery, Walter Swinburn, and Mouse Morris the 2006 Cheltenham Gold Cup winning trainer with the horse War of Attrition.

Governance
Prestbury civil parish has been in the Borough of Cheltenham since 1991; it was in Cheltenham Rural District from 1894 to 1974, and the Borough of Tewkesbury from 1974 to 1991.

The parish is presently split between four wards of the Borough of Cheltenham: Swindon Village, Prestbury, Pittville (a very small part) and Oakley; three electoral divisions of the county of Gloucestershire: St Paul's and Swindon, Pittville and Prestbury, and All Saints and Oakley; and two parliamentary constituencies: Tewkesbury and Cheltenham.

Gallery

References

External links 

Villages in Gloucestershire
Areas of Cheltenham
Reportedly haunted locations in South West England